The C P Goenka International School (abbreviated to CPGIS) is a private, co-educational day school, with its branches at Mumbai's Juhu, Oshiwara, Borivali, Thane and Wagholi (Pune) in Maharashtra, India. The school is affiliated with the International General Certificate of Secondary Education (GCSE), Central Board of Secondary Education (CBSE), Indian Certificate of Secondary Education (ICSE) and IB Diploma Programme (IBDP).

CP Goenka's Juhu campus was listed amongst the top schools in Mumbai City in an annual survey published by The Times of India's 'Times School Survey' in 2018.

Early History 
It was established by Sandeep Goenka and Archana Goenka in 2000. The school is a part of C P Goenka International Group of Schools, which also owns Swami Vivekanand International School and Spring Buds International Preschool. It is run by the Citizens Welfare Association, a public trust registered under the Bombay Public Trust Act, 1950.

Academics 
C P Goenka International School has been authorized to offer a combination of the following programmes from International General Certificate of Secondary Education (GCSE), Central Board of Secondary Education (CBSE), Indian Certificate of Secondary Education (ICSE) and IB Diploma Programme (IBDP) across its 5 campuses.

Fun Activities 
The C P Goenka International School's Wagholi campus organized a blood donation camp in association with Army Hospital, Pune in February 2019. The Borivali campus of CP Goenka International School participated in a cleanup drive at Versova Beach, Mumbai in September 2019.

Awards and recognition 
 In a survey by Times School Survey in 2018, C P Goenka International School's Juhu campus was ranked as the 3rd best International school in Mumbai in Zone B for International Curriculum.
 The school has been listed among the Ultimate Schools of Mumbai by Hindustan Times.
 C P Goenka International School won the Teaching Excellence Award at International School Awards 2019, held in Dubai.
 The school was ranked amongst the Top 5 International Schools in Mumbai at the GTF (Global Triumph Foundation) World Summit 2019.
 C P Goenka's Thane campus was rated #4th for goodwill, legacy and reputation and #7 for academic excellence in a list of India's Top School Ranking 2018: North Mumbai by the Elets 's Digital Learning (DL) Ranking.

See also

 List of schools in Maharashtra
 List of schools in Mumbai
 List of international schools in India

References

External links 
 

Private schools in Mumbai
International schools in Mumbai
International Baccalaureate schools in India
Education in Mumbai
Education in Thane
Education in Pune
Schools in Thane district